The 2000 Advanta Championships was a tennis tournament played on indoor carpet courts at the Philadelphia Civic Center in Philadelphia, Pennsylvania in the United States that was part of Tier II of the 2000 WTA Tour. It was the 18th edition of the tournament and was held from November 6 through November 12, 2000. Second-seeded Lindsay Davenport won the singles title and earned $87,000 first-prize money.

Finals

Singles

 Lindsay Davenport defeated  Martina Hingis 7–6(9–7), 6–4
 It was Davenport's 4th singles title of the year and the 30th of her career.

Doubles

 Martina Hingis /  Anna Kournikova defeated  Lisa Raymond /  Rennae Stubbs 6–2, 7–5

References

External links
 ITF tournament edition details
 Tournament draws

Advanta Championships of Philadelphia
Advanta Championships of Philadelphia
Advanta Championships of Philadelphia
Advanta Championships of Philadelphia
Advanta Championships of Philadelphia